is a Japanese-Canadian ice hockey player. He competed in the men's tournament at the 1998 Winter Olympics. Born Ryan Fujita, he changed his name to Kiyoshi Fujita after becoming a Japanese citizen in 1997.

References

1972 births
Living people
Japanese ice hockey players
Olympic ice hockey players of Japan
Ice hockey people from Alberta
Ice hockey players at the 1998 Winter Olympics
Sportspeople from Lethbridge
Asian Games gold medalists for Japan
Asian Games silver medalists for Japan
Medalists at the 1999 Asian Winter Games
Medalists at the 2003 Asian Winter Games
Ice hockey players at the 1999 Asian Winter Games
Ice hockey players at the 2003 Asian Winter Games
Asian Games medalists in ice hockey
Canadian sportspeople of Japanese descent
Tri-City Americans players
Saskatoon Blades players